LMMR may refer to:

 Llanelli and Mynydd Mawr Railway, heritage railway
 Llanelly and Mynydd Mawr Railway, historical
 Long Marston Military Railway